is a Japanese footballer currently studying at the Kyoto Sangyo University.

Career statistics

Club
.

Notes

References

External links

2002 births
Living people
Association football people from Hyōgo Prefecture
Kyoto Sangyo University alumni
Japanese footballers
Japan youth international footballers
Association football defenders
J3 League players
Gamba Osaka players
Gamba Osaka U-23 players